Morar (Mòrar) is a community in the Canadian province of Nova Scotia, located  in Antigonish County. It was named in 1888 by the Nova Scotia legislature for Morar in Scotland.

References

Communities in Antigonish County, Nova Scotia